Gising Na si Adan is a 2002 Philippine action film written, produced and directed by Felix E. Dalay. The film stars Gary Estrada in the title role.

Cast
 Gary Estrada as Lt. Adrian Crisologo
 Aya Medel as Sandra
 Via Veloso as Rachel
 Allona Amor as Monique
 Dick Israel as PSupt. Lance Crisologo
 Jeffrey Santos as Jepoy D'Pogi
 Charlie Davao as Gov. Monerola
 Lucita Soriano as Marta
 Cris Daluz as Pedro
 Alvin Anson as Rico
 Marco Polo Garcia as Bro. Max
 Edwin Reyes as Bro. Brix
 John Vincent Baclig as Jon-jon
 Brisel Lopez as Nancy
 Ernie Forte as Para
 Boy Gomez as Igme
 Falcon Laxa as Toktong
 Resty Hernandez as Sgt. Pork
 Manny Pungay as Capt. Beana
 Jaime Cuales as Pom-pom
 Jack Barri as Bert
 Christian Banzil as Chris
 Rosalinda Rosal as Sexy Dancer
 Pepito Diaz as Gen. Silorio
 Atong Frias as Police Colonel
 Rey Fabian as Police Officer
 Lance Garrick Celis as Floor Manager
 Ronald Asinas as Sgt. Asinas
 Benjie Pamintuan as Mokong
 Marlon Angeles as Hostage Taker Leader
 Kim Santos as Sales Representative
 Noel Elmido as Red Plate Car Driver
 Nido De Jesus as Pier Security Guard

References

External links

2002 films
2002 action films
Filipino-language films
Philippine action films
Films directed by Felix Dalay